Rich LeFevre (nickname "The Locust") is a competitive eater from Henderson, Nevada. Rich and his wife, Carlene LeFevre, are sometimes referred to as "the First Family of Competitive Eating", and are both top ranked members of the International Federation of Competitive Eating. The couple has combined to take two of the top seven places in Nathan's Hot Dog Eating Contest in 2003, 2004, and 2005. He competed at Wing Bowl XIV in Philadelphia, Pennsylvania in which he placed second behind Joey Chestnut, another IFOCE champion.

World records

 Chili: 1½ U.S. gallons Stagg Chili in 10 minutes
 Corn dogs: 12 Fletcher's Corny Dogs in 10 minutes at State Fair of Texas on September 28, 2003
 Pizza: 7½ extra large Bacci pizza slices in 15 minutes in Chicago on July 9, 2005
 Smoked pork: 7 pounds 1 ounce smoked pork in 10 minutes at Bluffs Run Casino on August 21, 2005
 Spam: 6 pounds of Spam from the can in 12 minutes on April 3, 2004
 Tex-Mex rolls: 30  rolls in 12 minutes at GameWorks at Great Lakes Crossing on March 12, 2005
 Jalapeños: 247 jalapeños in 8 minutes to set new world record on 10 August or 8 October 2006
 Completed 120 ounce steak challenge including 2 sides for 6 in 40 minutes on 10/17/08 at Brand Steakhouse in the Monte Carlo Hotel/Casino in Las Vegas

See also
 List of competitive eaters

References

External links
 International Federation of Competitive Eating (IFOCE) profile

Year of birth missing (living people)
Living people
American competitive eaters
People from Henderson, Nevada